Inositol hexakisphosphate kinase 1 is an enzyme that in humans is encoded by the IP6K1 gene.

This gene encodes a protein that belongs to the inositol phosphokinase (IPK) family. This protein is likely responsible for the conversion of inositol hexakisphosphate (InsP6) to diphosphoinositol pentakisphosphate (InsP7/PP-InsP5). It may also convert 1,3,4,5,6-pentakisphosphate (InsP5) to PP-InsP4. Alternative splicing occurs for this gene; however, the full-length nature of all transcript variants has not yet been described.

References

Further reading

See also 
 Inositol-hexakisphosphate kinase